Claira is a commune in the Pyrénées-Orientales department in southern France.

Geography 
Claira is located in the canton of La Côte Salanquaise and in the arrondissement of Perpignan.

Claira is located 5 km from Perpignan.

Population

See also
Communes of the Pyrénées-Orientales department

References

External links

Histoire du Roussillon (French)

Communes of Pyrénées-Orientales